How Baxter Butted In is a 1925 American silent comedy film directed by William Beaudine.

Plot
As described in a film magazine review, Henry Baxter is bashful and fails to get ahead in the world because people do not understand him. That is, all but Beulah Dyer, whom he loves blindly. His hard luck increases when a widowed sister-in-law and her two children descend upon his household. He works days at the office and nights doing clerical work for a druggist until his health fails him. Walter Higgins, his office boss, has stolen Henry's idea of boosting newspaper circulation by giving valor banquets to heroes. When Henry recovers from his illness, he is invited to one and finds that his struggles are appreciated as real heroism. When his home catches fire, and spurred on by the desire to be the other sort of hero, Henry thrusts aside the firemen and rescues the children himself.

Cast

Preservation
With no prints of How Baxter Butted In located in any film archives, it is a lost film.

References

External links

 

1925 films
1925 comedy films
1925 lost films
Silent American comedy films
American silent feature films
American black-and-white films
Films directed by William Beaudine
Lost American films
Lost comedy films
1920s American films